Azatadine (Optimine) is a first-generation antihistamine and anticholinergic that was launched by Schering-Plough in 1973.

It was patented in 1967.  It has been succeeded by both loratadine and desloratadine. and marketing approvals have been widely withdrawn.

See also 
 Azatadine/pseudoephedrine

References 

Piperidines
Benzocycloheptapyridines
H1 receptor antagonists
Abandoned drugs
1973 introductions